Copperton is a metro township in Salt Lake County, Utah, United States, located at the mouth of Bingham Canyon, approximately  southwest of Salt Lake City. The metro township boundaries include a smaller area than that of both the former CDP (designated by the U.S. Census) and the former township.  Much of the town is included in the Copperton Historic District, which is listed on the National Register of Historic Places.

Demographics

History

Copperton was established in 1926, by the Utah Copper Company as a residential area and "model city" for its employees. It emerged as a "showplace for company-subsidized family life." Housing construction ended in the 1930s, and company-furnished housing ended in 1955. After that, a private real estate developer managed the homes for employees. A rather large park was also built in the small town.  

As of the 2010 Census, Copperton has a population of 826. Copperton is the only mining town remaining for the Bingham Canyon Mine after Lark was torn down in 1980. Currently, only a handful of residents work for the mine. The town's history is directly linked to the mine.

The 2017 American Community Survey reported the population at 579.

In 2015, the township's residents voted to incorporate and become a metro township.

Climate
Climate is characterized by relatively high temperatures and evenly distributed precipitation throughout the year. The Köppen Climate Classification subtype for this climate is "Cfa" (Humid Subtropical Climate).

See also

 List of census-designated places in Utah

References

External links

Townships in Salt Lake County, Utah
Census-designated places in Utah
Salt Lake City metropolitan area
Mining communities in Utah
Populated places established in 1926
Company towns in Utah
Census-designated places in Salt Lake County, Utah
Townships in Utah
1926 establishments in Utah